Josephine Acosta Pasricha (born March 26, 1945) is a Filipino indologist who translated the "Ramacharitamanasa" of Tulasi Dasa, the Hindi translation of the Ramayana by Valmiki in Sanskrit, into the Filipino language.

Pasricha herself was mentored by Filipino indologist Juan R. Francisco. She made a complete unpublished Filipino translation of the seven books of the "Ramacharitamanasa" of Tulasi Dasa, accompanied with contextual, intertextual and textual analysis, and cross-references with Sanskrit, Hindi and English translations.

An expert in the Ramayana and the Mahabharata, she is also a Ford Foundation research scholar to the University of Delhi. She is currently teaching humanities in the University of Santo Tomas in Manila. In the undergraduate level, she teaches Art Appreciation, Aesthetics and Hermeneutics. In the graduate level, she teaches Advanced Aesthetics, Advanced Hermeneutics, Cultural Studies, Feminist Philosophy and Theology of the Body.

She is one of the editors of the Filipino translation of Kama Sutra by Marvin Reyes and Paz Panganiban. The translation is based on the work of Vatsyayana and Sir Richard Burton.

Personal life
Pasricha is married to an Indian man and has two daughters, Sarina and Satya (also known as Selene). Both daughters were raised in the Philippines and now work in India for a global Indian Informational Technology company.

Works

Author
The Theory of the Sublime in the Mahabharata
 Introduction to Art Appreciation, co-author with Manolita Policarpio and Inez Pascual
 Introduction to Art Appreciation and Aesthetics, co-author with Tomas Hernandez

Editor
Kama Sutra, a Filipino translation

See also 

 Filipinos in India
 Indomania
 Indian Filipino
 List of India-related topics in the Philippines

References

1945 births
Living people
Filipino translators
Filipino Indologists
Hermeneutists
Delhi University alumni
Academic staff of the University of Santo Tomas